is a freshwater caldera lake in Satsumasendai, Kagoshima Prefecture, Japan. It forms part of Imutaike Prefectural Natural Park. Its plant communities were designated a Natural Monument of Japan in 1921 and sixty hectares of wetlands were designated a Ramsar Site in 2005.

Geography
Imuta-ike is surrounded by mountains; Funamidake, San-o-dake, Katagi-yama, Tōmigashiro, Ī-moriyama (known due to its beauty also as Imuta-fuji), and there is no incoming large river. The outgoing water flows into Sendai River and Hiwagi River. Imuta-ike is in the last stage of the lake-pond formation cycle and is shrinking with the deposition of sediment. The colour of the pond is brown, 14 on the Forel-Ule scale, and its pH is 6.8; the water of the pond contains organic substances. There are many cherry trees around the pond. About one third of its area, to the northwest, is wetland; dotted by floating islands composed of peat. This is very rare in warm areas and the pond was designated a Natural Monument as the "peat forming vegetation of Imuta-ike" in 1921.

Biota
On the surface of the pond, phragmites and wild rice grow thick and in the water, there are brasenia, nymphaea tetragona, water caltrop.  As for fish, species include Zacco platypus, Black bass, Carassius langsdorfii and Oryzias latipes. A rare dragonfly, Libellula angelina is found, leading to the pond's selection as a Ramsar Site.

History
Between 300,000 and 400,000 years ago, there were groups of lava domes, 4 km from east to west and 7 km from north to south. The centre of the domes was depressed forming a caldera. The lava dome formed Iimori-yama. The depression collected water and Imuta-ike was formed.

Prior to the Taishō era (1912–1926), Imuta-ike was known for the growth of common rushes (Juncus effusus), the raw material for tatami mats. In autumn, villagers used to cut and bundle rushes. Between 1741 and 1763, a 380-meter tunnel water lane was made at the eastern end of the pond, and 15 hectares of rice fields were made. In 1953, Imuta-ike was made a Prefectural Natural Park.

See also
List of Ramsar sites in Japan
List of Special Places of Scenic Beauty, Special Historic Sites and Special Natural Monuments

References

External links
 Imuta-ike Ramsar Site

Landforms of Kagoshima Prefecture
Ramsar sites in Japan
Lakes of Japan
Natural monuments of Japan
Volcanic crater lakes